Sequim is a city in Clallam County, Washington, United States. It is located along the Dungeness River near the base of the Olympic Mountains. The 2010 census counted a population of 6,606.

However, the city is relatively close to some of the wettest temperate rainforests of the contiguous United States. This climate anomaly is sometimes called the "Blue Hole of Sequim". Fogs and cool breezes from the Juan de Fuca Strait make Sequim's climate more humid than would be expected from the low average rate of annual precipitation. 

Some places have surprisingly luxuriant forests, dominated by Douglas-fir and western red cedar. Other trees growing in the area include black cottonwood, red alder, bigleaf maple, Pacific madrone, lodgepole pine and Garry oak, all of which can grow to a significant size. Historically, much of the area was an open, oak-studded prairie, supported by somewhat excessively-drained  gravelly and sandy loam soil; agriculture and development of the Dungeness valley have changed this ecosystem. Most soils under Sequim have been placed in a series that is named after the city. This "Sequim series" is one of the few Mollisols in western Washington and its high base saturation, a characteristic of the Mollisol order, is attributed to the minimal leaching of bases caused by low annual rainfall.

The city and the surrounding area are particularly known for the commercial cultivation of lavender, supported by the unique climate. It makes Sequim the "Lavender Capital of North America", rivaled only in France. The area is also known for its Dungeness crab.

Sequim is pronounced as one syllable, with the e elided: "skwim". The name developed from the Klallam language.

History

Aboriginal inhabitants 
Fossils discovered in the late 1970s – at a dig near Sequim known as the Manis Mastodon site, by Carl Gustafson, an archaeologist at Washington State University – included a mastodon bone with an embedded bone point, evidencing the presence of hunters in the area about 14,000 years ago. According to Michael R. Waters, an archaeologist at Texas A&M University, this is the first hunting weapon found that dates to the pre-Clovis period.

The S'Klallam tribe had inhabited the region prior to the arrival of the first Europeans. S'Klallam means  "the strong people".  The band of S'Klallam Indians disbanded into their own individual federally recognized tribes in the early 1900s.  The local tribe is the Jamestown S'Klallam tribe, named after one of their early leaders, Lord James Balch. According to other tales, the town Sequim in S'Klallam means "a place for going to shoot", which represents the abundance of game and wildlife of the area.

Settlement 
Manuel Quimper and George Vancouver explored the region's coast in the 1790s. The first European settlers arrived in the Dungeness Valley in the 1850s, settling nearby Dungeness, Washington. While the lands along the river became fertile farmlands, the remainder of the area remained arid prairie, known as "the desert". Irrigation canals first brought water to the prairie in the 1890s, allowing the expansion of farmlands.

Sequim was officially incorporated on October 31, 1913. For many decades small farms, mostly dairy farms, dotted the area around the small town. Near the end of World War I, Sequim became a stop for a railway that passed through from Port Angeles to Port Townsend, built primarily to carry wood products from the forests of the western Olympic Peninsula.

Geography 
Sequim is located at  (48.078002, -123.101427).

Climate 
Sequim experiences a warm-summer Mediterranean climate (Köppen climate classification Csb), sometimes classified as an oceanic climate owing to the relatively cool temperatures. Sequim is in the rain shadow of the Olympic Mountains, so annual precipitation is only 16 inches. 
Winters are mostly mild with very little snowfall. Many years there is no snow at all.

Demographics

2020 census 
As of the census of 2020, there were 8,018 people and 3,480 households in the city. The racial makeup of the city was 86.7% White, 1.9% African American, 0.9% Native American, 3.1% Asian, 0.0% Pacific Islander, and 6.1% from two or more races. Hispanic or Latino people of any race were 8.5% of the population.

19.3% of residents were under the age of 18; and 34.0% were 65 years of age or older. The gender makeup of the city was 44.7% male and 55.3% female.

2010 census 
As of the census of 2010, there were 6,606 people, 3,340 households, and 1,626 families residing in the city. The racial makeup of the city was 91.3% (2020=86.7%) White, 0.4% (2020=1.9%) African American, 1.2% Native American, 1.9% (2020=3.1%) Asian, 0.1% Pacific Islander, 1.7% from other races, and 3.2% from two or more races. Hispanic or Latino people of any race were 4.8% (2020=8.5%) of the population.

[Note: The U.S. Postal Service delivers to 28,000+ people within Sequim's zip code, 98382 (2020=30,000+). 2/3 of these postal patrons live outside the Sequim city limits in Clallam County.]

There were 3,340 households, of which 17.1% had children under the age of 18 living with them, 36.5% were married couples living together, 9.4% had a female householder with no husband present, 2.8% had a male householder with no wife present, and 51.3% were non-families. 45.5% of all households were made up of individuals, and 29.2% had someone living alone who was 65 years of age or older. The average household size was 1.87 and the average family size was 2.57.

The median age in the city was 57.9 years. 15.2% of residents were under the age of 18; 6.3% were between the ages of 18 and 24; 15.9% were from 25 to 44; 22.1% were from 45 to 64; and 40.4% were 65 years of age or older. The gender makeup of the city was 44.4% male and 55.6% female.

2000 census 
More detailed information from the 2000 census indicated that the racial makeup of the city was 93.91% White, 0.30% African American, 1.15% Native American, 1.75% Asian, 0.09% Pacific Islander, 0.92% from other races, and 1.87% from two or more races. Hispanic or Latino people of any race were 2.86% of the population.

There were 2,163 households, out of which 15.5% had children under the age of 18 living with them, 40.1% were married couples living together, 9.1% had a female householder with no husband present, and 48.6% were non-families. 44.0% of all households were made up of individuals, and 30.5% had someone living alone who was 65 years of age or older. The average household size was 1.90 and the average family size was 2.55.

In the city, the age distribution of the population shows 15.3% under the age of 18, 5.4% from 18 to 24, 15.2% from 25 to 44, 19.5% from 45 to 64, and 44.5% who were 65 years of age or older. The median age was 59 years. For every 100 females, there were 73.2 males. For every 100 females age 18 and over, there were 68.9 males.

The median income for a household in the city was $27,880, and the median income for a family was $35,652. Males had a median income of $35,160 versus $20,347 for females. The per capita income for the city was $19,253. About 9.8% of families and 13.9% of the population were below the poverty line, including 19.9% of those under age 18 and 10.7% of those age 65 or over.

Culture
Sequim holds an Irrigation Festival every May. , it is the longest continually running festival in the state and is in its 124th year.

Tourist attractions 

Sequim is home to a herd of Roosevelt elk. The herd occasionally crosses US 101 just to the southeast of the town. Radio collars on some members of the herd trigger warning lights for motorists.
Over the past two decades, Sequim has become known for growing lavender and holds the annual Sequim Lavender Weekend (the third weekend in July).
The Museum and Arts Center features both natural and cultural exhibits, including a mastodon mural mounted with the remaining mastodon bones, artifacts, and a video on the excavation.
The Dungeness National Wildlife Refuge is located just north of the city, near the mouth of the Dungeness River. It includes the Dungeness Spit and a five-mile (8 km) hike to the New Dungeness Lighthouse at the end of the spit.
To the east along Highway 101 is Sequim Bay, a 4-mile (6.5 km) long inlet from the Strait of Juan de Fuca. Along the western stretch is the Sequim Bay State Park. The inlet is a popular birdwatching area.

Education
The Sequim School District served a population of almost 29,000 as of 2018. It is home to the following schools:
Sequim High School
Sequim Middle School
Olympic Peninsula Academy
Helen Haller Elementary
Greywolf Elementary

Private schools:
Five Acre School

Media 
The local news publications consist of the community newspaper Sequim Gazette and the Peninsula Daily News.

Sequim is served by several radio stations. KSQM, FM 91.5 is a non-commercial station staffed by community volunteers featuring a variety of music. Z-104.9 FM, KZQM is a commercial station featuring classic hits.

Newsradio KONP also provides local news, talk and sports programming on 1450 AM and 101.3 FM.

Sister city 
Sequim's sister city is Shiso, Hyōgo, Japan. Sequim and Shiso have an exchange student program set up through Sequim High School and Sequim Middle School.

Notable people 
Richard B. Anderson, World War II soldier, posthumous Medal of Honor recipient
 Princess Marie-Christine of Belgium, daughter of the late Belgian King Leopold III of Belgium and aunt of the current Monarch of Belgium, King Filip
 Bailey Bryan, country music artist
 Matthew Dryke, two-time world champion skeet shooter and Olympic gold medalist
 Dorothy Eck, Montana politician
 Hal Keller, baseball player and executive
 Donald M. Kendall, former CEO PepsiCo and political adviser
 Robbie Knievel, daredevil and stunt performer
 Jesse Marunde, 2005 World's Strongest Man runner-up
 James Henry McCourt, Wisconsin politician
 Pauline Moore, actress
 Andrew Nisbet, Jr., member of the Washington House of Representatives and Army officer
 Joe Rantz, rower and Olympic gold medalist; depicted in the book Boys in the Boat
Jennifer Thomas, classical pianist, violinist, composer, and recording artist
Wesley Stromberg, musician, lead singer of American pop band Emblem3.
Leo Sampson Goolden, YouTuber, sailor and shipwright. Restored the classic yacht Tally Ho in Sequim before relocating to Port Townsend.

Musical groups
 Emblem3, musical group
 Bailey Bryan, country music artist

References

External links 

 
 North Olympic Library System
 Sequim School District

 Sequim City US 2020 Census Data
 Clallam County, WA US 2020 Census Data

Cities in Clallam County, Washington
Cities in Washington (state)
Populated coastal places in Washington (state)
Washington placenames of Native American origin